Private Richard Beddows (June 27, 1843 to February 15, 1922) was a British soldier who fought in the American Civil War. Beddows was awarded the United States' highest award for bravery during combat, the Medal of Honor, for his action in Spotsylvania, Virginia during the Battle of Spotsylvania Courthouse on 18 May 1864. He was honored with the award on July 10, 1896.

Biography
Beddows was born in Liverpool, England on 27 June 1843. He enlisted in the army in August 1861, and mustered out with his battery in June 1865.  He died on 15 February 1922, and his remains were interred at the Holy Sepulchre Cemetery in New Rochelle, New York.

Medal of Honor citation

See also

List of American Civil War Medal of Honor recipients: A–F

External links

References

 

1843 births
1922 deaths
English-born Medal of Honor recipients
British emigrants to the United States
Military personnel from Liverpool
People of New York (state) in the American Civil War
Union Army soldiers
United States Army Medal of Honor recipients
American people of Welsh descent
American Civil War recipients of the Medal of Honor
Burials at Holy Sepulchre Cemetery (New Rochelle, New York)